Voskhod is a rural locality (a village) in Mishkinsky Selsoviet, Mishkinsky District, Bashkortostan, Russia. The population was 15 as of 2010. There is 1 street.

Geography 
Voskhod is located 11 km west of Mishkino (the district's administrative centre) by road. Leninskoye is the nearest rural locality.

References 

Rural localities in Mishkinsky District